The discography of Bethel Music, an American Christian worship collective based in Redding, California, comprises fourteen live albums, 3 studio albums, one extended play, one compilation album, four instrumental remix albums, ten singles as well as seventy-four music videos and sixty-five lyric videos.

Bethel made its debut in 2010 with Here Is Love, their first live album, which also featured Jesus Culture artists, was released alongside Integrity Music. They immediately rose to prominence with their second live LP Be Lifted High in 2011, which contained popular worship anthems such as "Love Came Down" and "One Thing Remains", and peaked at No. 7 on Billboard's Christian Albums Chart in the United States. In early 2012, Bethel Music released The Loft Sessions, the collective's third live album, which reached No. 3 on Christian Albums Chart, concurrently making Bethel Music's debut on the all-genre Billboard 200 Chart at No. 44. Later on in the year, For the Sake of the World was released in October. The album was the group's third Top 10 appearance on Billboard's Christian Albums Chart, peaking at No. 2.

In 2013, Bethel released three albums: Without Words, Tides and Discover Bethel Music. Released in March alongside Integrity Music, Without Words was Bethel's first instrumental remix album. When the Official Charts Company launched the Official Christian & Gospel Albums Chart for the identifying the top twenty bestselling Christian and Gospel releases in the United Kingdom in March 2013, Bethel made its debut on the chart with two releases in the top ten: Without Words at No. 2 and For the Sake of the World at No. 6. The release of Tides, the collective's first studio album, followed in early September, becoming Bethel's first No. 1 on the Christian Albums Chart in the United States, and on the Official Christian & Gospel Albums Chart in the United Kingdom whilst making Bethel's debut on the all-genre Official Albums Chart at No. 79. Tides Live was released in early 2014, repeating the feat of topping the Christian Albums Chart in the US and the UK's Official Christian & Gospel Albums Chart.

In April 2014, You Make Me Brave was released, becoming Bethel's first Top 10 entry on the Billboard 200, being the tenth best-selling album in the United States for the week ending May 10.

January 2015 saw the release of the collective's seventh live album, We Will Not Be Shaken, which, having sold nearly 30,000 copies in its debut retail week, became their third consecutive album to top both Christian music charts in the US and the UK, and the collective's first Top 10 entry on Billboard's Canadian Albums Chart and the Official New Zealand Music Chart, peaking at 9 in Canada for the week ending February 14, also being the tenth best-selling album in New Zealand at its peak. Without Words: Synesthesia, their second instrumental remix album, was released on the last day of July in the same year, becoming the collective's eighth Top 10 on Billboard's Christian Albums Chart peaking at No 2.

Bethel Music released Have It All in March 2016, its first live album to be recorded at Bethel Church since For the Sake of the World and their fourth album overall to be recorded at Bethel Church. Have It All started at No. 2 on the Billboard Christian Albums Chart in its opening week with 25,000 copies sold, peaking at No. 12 on the Billboard 200. The album also broke into the Top 10 of Australia's ARIA Top 100 Albums Chart at No. 8. Starlight was released on April 7, 2017, selling 20,000 equivalent album units in the week ending April 13, also rising to No. 1 on the Billboard Christian Albums chart dated April 29, 2017. Starlight made its debut on the ARIA Albums Chart at No. 15, becoming the fourth album by Bethel Music to enter Australia's Top 50 Albums Chart. Bethel went on to release After All These Years (Instrumental), their third remix album, in July 2017, debuting at No. 43 on Billboard Christian Albums chart.

In May 2018, Bethel Music issued its first spontaneous worship album, Moments: Mighty Sound, recorded live at Bethel Church, with 5,000 equivalent album units being sold in the week ending May 17, 2018 to debut at number 2 on Billboard Christian Albums and 168 on Billboard 200 charts.

Albums

Studio albums

Live albums

Remix albums

Compilation albums
 Discover Bethel Music (2013)

Extended plays
 Tides: The Streaming EP (2013)

Singles

Other charted songs

Videos

Music videos

Lyric videos

Notes

References

External links
  on Bethel Music website
  on AllMusic
  on iTunes

Christian music discographies
Discographies of American artists